Get Squirrely (also distributed as A.C.O.R.N.S.: Operation Crack Down) is a 2015 American computer-animated heist comedy film produced by John H. Williams (through Vanguard Animation) and Dan Krech and directed by Ross Venokur. Released on November 4, 2016, the film is Vanguard Animation's first theatrically released feature film since 2010's Space Chimps 2: Zartog Strikes Back. However, the film received mixed reviews.

Plot
Frankie (Jason Jones), a smooth-talking squirrel, finds out that acorns are being stolen by the evil A.C.O.R.N.S. Corporation. Now he must assemble a rag-tag team of forest animals with only three days to pull off their biggest heist yet.

Cast
 Jason Jones as Frankie
 Will Forte as Cody
 John Leguizamo as Fly Boy/Liam
 Samantha Bee as Raitch
 Victoria Justice as Lola
 John Cleese as Mr. Bellwood
 Jim Cummings as Bear/Edsy

Development
The film was first announced in 2011 under the original title The Nut House.

References

External links

2015 films
2010s American animated films
Vanguard Animation
Animated films about squirrels
2010s English-language films